Allen Creek is a  long 3rd order tributary to the Banister River in Pittsylvania County, Virginia.

Course 
Allen Creek rises 1 miles southeast of Straightstone, Virginia in Pittsylvania County and then flows south-southwest to join the Banister River about 1 miles southwest of Hermosa.

Watershed 
Allen Creek drains  of area, receives about 45.2 in/year of precipitation, has a wetness index of 394.34, and is about 59% forested.

See also 
 List of Virginia Rivers

References 

Rivers of Virginia
Rivers of Pittsylvania County, Virginia
Tributaries of the Roanoke River